Trigonia is an extinct genus of saltwater clams, fossil marine bivalve mollusk in the family Trigoniidae. The fossil range of the genus spans the Paleozoic, Mesozoic and Paleocene of the Cenozoic, from 298 to 56 Ma.

Description 
The genus Trigonia is the most readily identifiable member of the family Trigoniidae, having a series of strong ribs or costae along the anterior part of the shell exterior. They are the first representatives of the family to appear in the Middle Triassic (Anisian) of Chile and New Zealand. The first European examples (Trigonia costata Parkinson) appear in the Lower Jurassic (Toarcian) of Sherborne, Dorset and Gundershofen, Switzerland.

Species 
The following Trigonia species have been described:

 T. analoga
 T. antiqua
 T. castani
 T. castrovillensis
 T. coqueiroensis
 T. costata
 T. cragini
 T. depauperata
 T. eufaulensis gabbi
 T. eufaulensis moorei
 T. guildi
 T. hemisphaerica
 T. imbricata
 T. interlaevigata
 T. intersitans
 T. kitchini
 T. maastrichtiana
 T. maloneana
 T. marginata
 T. mearnsi
 T. montanaensis
 T. orientalis
 T. papuana
 T. picteti
 T. plana
 T. pseudocaudata
 T. pseudocrenulata
 T. pullus
 T. rebouli
 T. reesidei
 T. resoluta
 T. reticulata
 T. saavedra
 T. semiculta
 T. somaliensis
 T. stantoni
 T. stolleyi
 T. suborbicularis
 T. sulcata
 T. taffi
 T. thierachensis
 T. undulatocostata
 T. vyschetzkii
 T. weaveri

Distribution 
Fossils of Trigonia have been registered in:
Permian
Bolivia (Copacabana Formation)

Triassic
Austria, China, Italy, the Russian Federation, United States (Alaska, Idaho), and Vietnam.

Jurassic
Afghanistan, Argentina, Canada (Alberta, British Columbia, Yukon), Chile, Colombia (Valle Alto Formation, Caldas), Egypt, Ethiopia, France, Germany, Greenland, India, Iran, Japan, Kenya, Luxembourg, Madagascar, Morocco, New Zealand, Poland, Portugal, the Russian Federation, Saudi Arabia, Somalia, Spain, Tanzania, Thailand, Tunisia, the United Kingdom, United States (Alaska, California, Idaho, Montana, Nevada, Oregon, Texas, Utah, Wyoming), and Yemen.

Cretaceous
Afghanistan, Algeria, Antarctica, Argentina, Armenia, Australia, Brazil, Bulgaria, Canada (British Columbia), Chile, Colombia (Yuruma Formation, La Guajira, Macanal Formation, Eastern Ranges), Egypt, France, Germany, Greenland, Hungary, Italy, Lebanon, Mexico, the Netherlands, New Zealand, Papua New Guinea, Peru, Portugal, Serbia and Montenegro, South Africa, Spain, Switzerland, Tanzania, Turkmenistan, Russian Federation, Ukraine, the United Kingdom, United States (Arizona, California, Delaware, Mississippi, New Jersey, North Carolina, Tennessee, Texas), Venezuela, and Yemen.

Paleocene
Argentina (Cerro Dorotea Formation)

References

Bibliography

External links 
 Sepkoski's Online Genus Database

Trigoniidae
Paleozoic bivalves
Permian animals of South America
Permian Bolivia
Mesozoic bivalves
Mesozoic animals of Africa
Mesozoic animals of Asia
Mesozoic animals of Europe
Mesozoic animals of Oceania
Mesozoic animals of North America
Mesozoic animals of South America
Jurassic Argentina
Cretaceous Argentina
Cretaceous Brazil
Jurassic Chile
Cretaceous Chile
Jurassic Colombia
Cretaceous Colombia
Fossils of Colombia
Cretaceous Peru
Cretaceous Venezuela
Paleogene bivalves
Paleogene animals of South America
Paleogene Argentina
Permian first appearances
Paleocene genus extinctions
Cretaceous–Paleogene boundary
Fossil taxa described in 1789
Anisian life
Prehistoric bivalve genera
Fossils of Serbia